Chris Bennett (born 17 December 1989 in Aberdeen, Scotland) is a British hammer thrower. He competed at the 2016 Summer Olympics in the men's hammer throw event. He represented Scotland at the 2014 Commonwealth Games.

References

External links 
 

Living people
1989 births
Sportspeople from Aberdeen
British male hammer throwers
Scottish male hammer throwers
Olympic male hammer throwers
Olympic athletes of Great Britain
Athletes (track and field) at the 2016 Summer Olympics
Commonwealth Games competitors for Scotland
Athletes (track and field) at the 2018 Commonwealth Games
British Athletics Championships winners